Veli Lampi (born 18 July 1984) is a Finnish former professional football right back. Lampi was born in Seinäjoki, Southern Ostrobothnia, Finland where he played for the local youth teams before moving to VPS.

Club career

Youth clubs
Lampi started his football career in Sepsi-78. He has also played for TP-Seinäjoki.

VPS Vaasa
He made his Veikkausliiga debut in VPS where he played 47 matches and scored 6 goals between 2002 and 2004.

HJK Helsinki
In 2005 Lampi transferred from VPS to HJK. He represented HJK in 49 matches and achieved two Veikkausliiga silver medals and a cup victory.

FC Zürich
He was part of the 2006–07 and 2008–09 Swiss Championship winning team with FC Zürich.

Willem II
He relegated from the Dutch Eredivisie with Willem II.

FC Arsenal Kyiv
On 10 September 2011, Lampi made his Ukrainian Premier League début for Arsenal Kyiv playing against FC Metalist Kharkiv.

Return to HJK
In December 2013 HJK announced that Lampi would return to HJK and that he had signed a two-year contract.

International career

Lampi was a regular member in the Finland national under-21 football team. In 2006, he made his debut for the full national side in a game against Saudi Arabia. He played five games in the 2010 FIFA World Cup qualification.

Honours

Club
HJK Helsinki

Veikkausliiga: 2014
Finnish Cup: 2006, 2014

FC Zürich
Swiss Super League: 2006–07, 2008–09

Country
Finland national football team
2014 Baltic Cup Bronze

Career statistics

Club

International

References

External links
 Veli Lampi at FC Arsenal Kyiv 
 
 
 
 
 
 
 Profile at FA of Finland's official website 
 

1984 births
Living people
People from Seinäjoki
Association football fullbacks
Finnish footballers
Finland international footballers
Finnish expatriate footballers
Expatriate footballers in Switzerland
Expatriate footballers in the Netherlands
Expatriate footballers in Ukraine
Finnish expatriate sportspeople in Ukraine
Finnish expatriate sportspeople in Switzerland
Helsingin Jalkapalloklubi players
FC Zürich players
FC Aarau players
Vaasan Palloseura players
Willem II (football club) players
FC Arsenal Kyiv players
Swiss Super League players
Eredivisie players
Ukrainian Premier League players
Sportspeople from South Ostrobothnia